39th Army may refer to:
39th Army (People's Republic of China)
39th Army (Soviet Union)
Thirty-Ninth Army (Japan)